Philip Michael Doughty (born 6 September 1986 in Kirkham, Lancashire) is an English professional footballer.

A defender, Doughty started his career at Blackpool in 2002 before moving up the Fylde coast to join Fleetwood Town in 2008.

Career

Blackpool
Born in Kirkham, Doughty signed as a trainee with Blackpool on 1 December 2002. Only six days later he became the youngest player to represent Blackpool in the FA Cup, when aged 16 years and 93 days he came on as a last-minute substitute against Torquay United in a second-round match whilst he was still at school locally in Kirkham and still too young to train with the Blackpool team, and he had to receive special permission to play from his headmaster at Carr Hill School.

On 3 May 2003, Doughty again needed his headmaster's permission to feature for Blackpool, this time as an unused substitute for Blackpool's final league game of the 2002-03 season against Chesterfield, when then Blackpool manager Steve McMahon named five youth team players in the matchday squad. In the summer of 2003 Doughty joined the club's youth team.

Doughty signed a two-year professional contract on 17 November 2004, with an option for a further two years at Blackpool after impressing as captain of the club's reserve team and also as an unused substitute as part of the first-team squad. Since then Doughty has played for the club in competitions such as the Football League Trophy, but not in the league.

On 14 January 2005, Doughty signed on loan with Leigh RMI, who were then in the Conference National where he was due to stay until 25 April. However, on 11 February, then Blackpool manager, Colin Hendry cancelled the loan deal after Doughty had played in just one game out of a possible four. In October, Doughty broke two bones in his leg in a youth-team match and was told he would be out of action for between nine and twelve months.

After finally recovering from a fractured tibia and fibula, Doughty became a regular in the Blackpool reserve team, and on 29 March 2007, he was loaned out to Conference North club Barrow until the end of the 2006-07 season. In July 2007, Blackpool extended his contract by one year with an option for further twelve months.

Although a regular in the Blackpool reserve team, and despite being seen earlier in his career as one of the club's brightest prospects, Doughty had not played a first-team game for Blackpool for three years when, on 7 November 2007, he joined Football League Two club Macclesfield Town on a one-month loan deal in order to get some first-team football, and to try and earn a new contract with Blackpool, where his contract is due to finish at the end of the 2007-08 season. Doughty was offered a permanent deal to sign for Macclesfield when his loan spell with the club ended on 17 January 2008, with manager Ian Brightwell keen to sign Doughty. However, he turned down the move and instead the following day went out on a one-month loan again, this time to fellow League Two club Accrington Stanley after talks with manager John Coleman, with a view to a possible permanent move. However, after his loan spell, he returned to Blackpool on 21 February as defensive cover for the club due to injuries. On 7 May 2008, he was released by Blackpool.

Fleetwood Town
Doughty had trials at Hereford United and Huddersfield Town before signing for Fleetwood Town, newly promoted to the Conference North, with club manager, Tony Greenwood saying, "Phil is an ambitious young lad who has been looking for a Football League club and we have given him the shop window to achieve that". After struggling to maintain a first team place, Doughty joined Welsh Premier League side Welshpool Town on loan for the remainder of the 2008–09 season. He returned to Fleetwood at the end of the season.

AFC Fylde
Doughty signed a season-long loan deal with AFC Fylde on 17 June 2009. before joining them permanently.

Nelson
In June 2015, Doughty signed for North West Counties Football League Premier Division side Nelson from Bamber Bridge.

Career statistics

References

External links

Profile at Blackpool F.C.
Welsh Premier profile
Nelson profile at Nelson F.C.

1986 births
Living people
English footballers
Blackpool F.C. players
Leigh Genesis F.C. players
Barrow A.F.C. players
Macclesfield Town F.C. players
Accrington Stanley F.C. players
Fleetwood Town F.C. players
AFC Fylde players
Welshpool Town F.C. players
Bamber Bridge F.C. players
Nelson F.C. players
People from Kirkham, Lancashire
Northern Premier League players
National League (English football) players
English Football League players
Association football defenders